The Göttingen–Bebra railway is a mainline railway in Germany, running north–south, which mainly serves through traffic. It is part of the old North–South railway and until 1991 Intercity trains ran on it. Today it is used mainly by freight trains, as well as regional and night passenger trains.

History

Until 1945 

The section from Göttingen to Friedland was opened in 1867 as part of a line to Arenshausen connecting with the Halle–Kassel line.

After Prussia’s annexation of Hanover and the Electorate of Hesse (Kurhessen) after the 1866 war, it wanted a direct connection between the Hanoverian Southern line and the Frankfurt–Bebra line. Together with the planned Flieden–Gemünden line this would create a north–south axis. Moreover, it would provide connections with the Cannons Railway (Kanonenbahn)—which was planned to connect Berlin and Metz, serving military purposes. To the north it would connect with Göttingen and Hanover via the Hanoverian Southern line and to the south to Bebra and Hanau. Arenshausen and Witzenhausen were considered for the northern end of the new line, but it was decided that it would be at Friedland with a link to the Halle–Kassel line at Eichenberg.

In 1875, the section was opened from Bebra to Niederhone (now Eschwege West) and Eschwege town (the last part of this line later became part of the Kanonenbahn). A year later, the Niederhone–Eichenberg–Friedland section was opened. At the watersheds between the Fulda and Werra valleys at Cornberg and between the Werra and the Leine near Eichenberg significant slopes had to be overcome, requiring tunnels and a curvy alignment.

The direct Friedland–Arenshausen route was abandoned in 1884, as there were sufficient connections in Eichenberg.

Between 1908 and 1910 the rail infrastructure in Göttingen was rebuilt, tracks were raised above street level, the current marshalling yard was built and the new Göttingen–Bodenfelde railway was connected. A new alignment to Bebra was also built from Göttingen to Rosdorf west of the Leine hills. The old route went almost direct from Göttingen Station (with a junction with the old Dransfeld ramp line—the now closed southern end of the Hanoverian Southern line—at the Groner Landstraßeat level crossing) to Rosdorf.

Up to 1945 there was substantial but not outstanding traffic growth. In 1939 the line had four pairs of through trains, while the nearby Main-Weser line between Kassel and Frankfurt am Main had twelve pairs of trains.

Whisky-Vodka Line 
After 1866, borders were not significant in this region. That changed in 1945 at the end of World War II with the division of Germany into occupation zones. Just east of Eichenberg station the borders of the British, American and Soviet occupation zones met. The Göttingen–Bebra line was also divided. The Göttingen–Friedland section was in the British zone, Eichenberg and the Oberrieden–Bebra section was in the American zone, and about four kilometres of the line around Werleshausen (a locality in Witzenhausen) was in the Soviet zone.

In order to ease this situation, in 1945 Wanfried agreement provided for an exchange of territory:

The new boundary line, subsequently called sarcastically in German the Whisky-Wodka-Linie, meant that this section of the line was consistently under the control of the Western Allies, and thus completely in the area of the later West Germany. From Eichenberg to Bad Sooden-Allendorf, however, it was within sight of the watchtowers of the border to the east, later called the Iron Curtain. The border eventually led to the closure of several lines: the Halle–Kassel line east of Eichenberg and lines east of Eschwege, including the Leinefelde–Treysa line (part of the Kanonenbahn) and several branch lines.

Until 1990 
As a result of the Iron Curtain several eastern lines running parallel with the North–South railway were no longer usable, especially the Scandinavia–Rostock, Hamburg–Halle and Leipzig–Saal Railway–Nuremberg lines. The easternmost north–south route of the Federal Republic became known as the "western bypass of East Germany". Added to this was a strong general traffic growth. This made the North–South railway one of the most important lines. In the summer of 1989, 37 trains ran each day and each direction between Göttingen and Bebra.

In order to handle demand, the line was upgraded. Signalling was upgraded in the 1950s. The line was electrified by 1963. To accommodate the catenary the Braunhäuser Tunnel was opened up as a cutting, and in other tunnels the tracks were lowered.
Many smaller stations were abandoned. In addition, with the exception of the Eichenberg-Kassel main line, all the diverging routes were abandoned, at least for passengers.

Since 1990 

Since the 1960s it had become clear that the whole north–south route was overloaded and too slow to be attractive for long-distance services. At Eichenberg some curves had speed limits of 90 km/h, in Bebra there were limits of 70 km/h. This led to the planning and construction of the Hanover–Würzburg high-speed line, to which fast long-distance services were diverted in 1991. The old route is now used by freight trains, night trains and regional services.
In 1990, the Halle-Kassel railway reopened at Eichenberg, and for this purpose Eichenberg station was converted to handle border control for long-distance trains. However, German reunification quickly progressed, so that the station was only used for customs clearance for five weeks; the platform hall now appears oversized.

In 1998, the construction of a connecting curve followed northeast of Eichenberg, making possible direct operations from Göttingen to Heilbad Heiligenstadt. It assumed the function once performed by the line from Friedland to Arenshausen abandoned in 1884.

An additional 1,030-metre-long tunnel was built next to the Bebenroth Tunnel between 2010 and 2013, and the existing tunnel was rehabilitated. Both tubes now have only one track.

Current operations 
The line is dominated by through traffic, especially freight trains (many carrying containers and cars).

In addition, it is important for transport in Werra-Meißner district. Passenger transport is provided by cantus Verkehrsgesellschaft using Stadler FLIRT EMUs, running hourly between Göttingen and Fulda as RB7. 

At the timetable change on 13 December 2009, the Nordhessischer Verkehrsverbund (North Hesse Transport Association) added a service between Eschwege West and Eschwege town on its own infrastructure, which it had brought back into service and modernised. The old line, part of the closed Leinefelde–Treysa section of the Kanonenbahn, was joined to the Göttingen–Bebra line north and south of Eschwege West station. This meant that Eschwege West station was bypassed and it was closed for scheduled passenger services. A new station was opened at Eschwege-Niederhone. A two-storey car park and a central bus station was opened at Eschwege town station.

References

Footnotes

Sources
 
 
 

Railway lines in Hesse
Railway lines in Lower Saxony
Railway lines opened in 1867
1867 establishments in Prussia
Buildings and structures in Göttingen (district)